Gasol is a surname in Spain. Notable people with the surname include:

 Pau Gasol (born 1980), Spanish basketball player
 Marc Gasol (born 1985), Spanish basketball player

Catalan-language surnames